The 2022 FIM Moto3 World Championship was a part of the 74th F.I.M. Road Racing World Championship season. Izan Guevara won the championship for GasGas Aspar Team after the Australian Grand Prix.

Teams and riders 

All teams used series-specified Dunlop tyres.

Team changes 
 Petronas Sprinta Racing withdrew from the category at the end of the 2021 season following the loss of their sponsor. The team continued under the same management and different sponsor in the MotoGP class.
 A new British team, run by former rider Michael Laverty, joined the championship with the aim of providing British riders with a stepping stone into the world championship starting from the British Talent Cup which was established in 2018. The team was sponsored by VisionTrack and the team took over the Honda bikes vacated by the Petronas SRT team.
 Gresini Racing, who have competed from 2012 until 2021, left the championship to focus on their Moto2 and MotoGP teams.
 Team MTA, which has competed in the CIV since 2017 and the CEV since 2019, made their return to the Moto3 World Championship with KTM. The team previously competed in the Moto3 World Championship from 2014 to 2016 as "Team Italia", using Mahindra bikes.
 Prüstel GP switched from actual KTM machines to CFMoto-rebranded KTM bikes.

Rider changes 
 Reigning Moto3 Riders' Champion Pedro Acosta moved up to Moto2 still remaining with Red Bull KTM Ajo.
 Romano Fenati moved up to Moto2 a second time, joining Speed Up Racing.
 Niccolò Antonelli was promoted to Moto2 with the same team.
 Tatsuki Suzuki left Sic58 Squadra Corse and joined Leopard Racing, replacing Xavier Artigas.
 Iván Ortolá made his debut with Team MTA. He was joined by Stefano Nepa, who moved from Boé Owlride.
 Joel Kelso made his full-time debut with CIP Green Power, replacing Maximilian Kofler. Kelso has served as a replacement rider in 2021 and raced in the 2021 CEV Moto3 Junior World Championship.
 VisionTrack Racing Team signed Joshua Whatley and Scott Ogden for the 2022 campaign.
 Alberto Surra made his full-time Moto3 debut with Rivacold Snipers Team. Surra has served as both a wildcard and a replacement rider in 2021.
 David Muñoz made his debut with Boé SKX. He previously raced in the 2021 CEV Moto3 Junior World Championship and 2021 Red Bull MotoGP Rookies Cup.
 John McPhee moved from the withdrawn Petronas Sprinta Racing to Sterilgarda Max Racing Team. He teamed up with Ayumu Sasaki, who moved from Red Bull KTM Tech3. They both replaced Romano Fenati and Adrián Fernández.
 Elia Bartolini and Matteo Bertelle both made their full-time debuts with Avintia VR46 Riders Academy. Bartolini has served as both a wildcard and a replacement rider in 2021, while Bertelle has appeared as a wildcard in 2021 and raced in the 2021 Red Bull MotoGP Rookies Cup. They replaced Carlos Tatay and Niccolò Antonelli.
 Carlos Tatay and Xavier Artigas both moved to Prüstel GP. Tatay previously raced with Avintia Esponsorama, while Artigas previously raced with Leopard Racing in 2021. They replaced Ryusei Yamanaka and Filip Salač.
 Ryusei Yamanaka subsequently moved to the newly formed MT Helmets – MSi.
 Originally, Daniel Holgado was scheduled to make his debut with Red Bull KTM Tech3, teaming up with Deniz Öncü. However, it was subsequently announced that Holgado will join Red Bull KTM Ajo instead, where he would team up with Jaume Masià. Holgado has served as a replacement rider in 2021 and raced in both the 2021 CEV Moto3 Junior World Championship, where he won the championship, and 2021 Red Bull MotoGP Rookies Cup. Adrián Fernández took Holgado's entry at Tech3.
 Mario Aji and Taiyo Furusato both made their full-time debuts with Honda Team Asia. Aji has appeared as a wildcard rider in 2021 and raced in the 2021 CEV Moto3 Junior World Championship, while Furusato raced in the Asia Talent Cup. Both have also raced in the 2021 Red Bull MotoGP Rookies Cup.
 Diogo Moreira made his full-time debut with MT Helmets – MSi. He raced in both the 2021 Red Bull MotoGP Rookies Cup and 2021 CEV Moto3 Junior World Championship.
 Riccardo Rossi left Boé SKX and join Sic58 Squadra Corse, replacing Tatsuki Suzuki.
 Ana Carrasco made her return to Moto3 after racing the last five seasons in Supersport 300 World Championship, winning the 2018 title. She teamed up with David Muñoz at Boé SKX and replaced David Salvador who was initially signed to partner Muñoz.

Mid-season changes
Gerard Riu replaced David Muñoz for the first seven rounds due to Muñoz being under the minimum age.
Taiyo Furusato missed the Qatar and Indonesian rounds after having surgery due to a right ankle injury. He was not replaced for both races.
 John McPhee missed the Indonesian, Argentine, Americas, Portuguese, and Spanish rounds after sustaining two fractured vertebrae during training. He was not replaced for the first two races, but was replaced by David Salvador for the next three races.
Alberto Surra missed three races due to a right hand injury sustained in a FP3 crash during the Americas round. He was replaced by Syarifuddin Azman for the Portuguese and Spanish rounds, while José Antonio Rueda replaced him for the French round He returned during the Italian round, but suffered a fractured foot during FP3. He was replaced by Marcos Uriarte for the succeeding Catalan round. Surra also missed the Japanese round after sustaining a fractured right hand in a FP3 crash during the previous Aragon round. He was replaced by Kanta Hamada.
Ayumu Sasaki missed the Catalan round after suffering an injury during the previous Italian round. He was replaced by David Salvador.
Matteo Bertelle missed the Dutch round after suffering a left knee injury during the main race of the previous German round. He was replaced by Luca Lunetta. Bertelle underwent a season-ending surgery during the summer break and was replaced by Nicola Carraro for the rest of the season.
Joel Kelso missed the British round after suffering an injury during the previous Dutch round. He was replaced by Marc García.
Stefano Nepa missed the Valencian round after undergoing surgery to an injury suffered during the previous Malaysian round. He was replaced by David Salvador.

Calendar 
The following Grands Prix took place in 2022:

Grand Prix locations

Calendar changes 

 Cancelled Grands Prix in 2021 as a response to the COVID-19 pandemic, namely the Argentine, Finnish, Japanese, Thailand, Australian, and Malaysian Grands Prix, returned in 2022. Consequently, the Grands Prix held in 2021 that replaced the aforementioned cancelled races, namely the Doha, Styrian, Emilia Romagna, and Algarve Grands Prix, did not return in 2022.
 The previously mentioned Finnish Grand Prix was planned to return to the calendar after a 39-year absence. The venue hosting the round would have been the new Kymi Ring, instead of the Tampere Circuit used in 1962 and 1963 or the Imatra Circuit which hosted the round until 1982. The Grand Prix was included on both the 2020 and 2021 calendars, but both races were cancelled in response to the COVID-19 pandemic. However, the race scheduled for July was cancelled in May due to incomplete homologation works and the risks associated with the geopolitical situation in the region.
 The Indonesian Grand Prix returned to the calendar after a 24-year absence. The venue hosting the round was the new Mandalika International Street Circuit, instead of the Sentul International Circuit used in 1996 and 1997. The Grand Prix had been included in the 2021 calendar as a Reserve Grand Prix but was ultimately dropped before the end of the season.
 The Brazilian Grand Prix, which had previously been announced to return in 2022, was not included in the provisional calendar released on 7 October 2021.
 The Austrian Grand Prix used a new layout of the Red Bull Ring, wherein a chicane was added to the previous fast slight-left hander of turn 2. This was done to improve the overall safety of the track by greatly reducing the speed the riders take the turn. The final configuration was chosen among 15 proposals, with the track being 30 meters longer than the previous configurations.

Results and standings

Grands Prix

Riders' standings
Scoring system
Points were awarded to the top fifteen finishers. A rider had to finish the race to earn points.

Constructors' standings
Each constructor received the same number of points as their best placed rider in each race.

Teams' standings
The teams' standings were based on results obtained by regular and substitute riders; wild-card entries were ineligible.

Notes

References

External links 

 

Grand Prix motorcycle racing seasons